Peter Storm may refer to:

Peter Storm, the birth name of Swedish actor Peter Stormare
Peter Storm (clothing), a brand of outdoor clothing
Peter Storms, Master Commandant of the USS Peacock (1813)